David Dyment is a Canadian author and academic based in Ottawa, Canada. Most recently he taught at the Norman Paterson School of International Affairs and is a senior research associate in the Centre on North American Politics, both at Carleton University.  He has been a deputy director at Global Affairs Canada and has worked on the staff of the Governor General of Canada.  He is a director of Canadian International Council.

Biography
He received his doctorate from the Université de Montréal.

He is the author of Doing the Continental: A New Canadian-American Relationship, published by Dundurn Press in 2010. In May 2011, the book was listed on Quill & Quires bestseller list for non-fiction politics. A review  by Conrad Black appeared in the May 2011 issue of the Literary Review of Canada. 

He is a contributor to The Globe and Mail, the Toronto Star, the Vancouver Sun, and other Canadian newspapers. He has been a commentator on CTV, CBC Television, CBC Radio, Télévision de Radio-Canada and the BBC.

References

External links
 Official website

Canadian political scientists
Canadian non-fiction writers
Academic staff of the University of Ottawa
Academic staff of Carleton University
Université de Montréal alumni
Living people
1959 births